Avraham Sabu is a former Israeli footballer who played in Beitar Tel Aviv, Maccabi Netanya and Beitar Jerusalem.

Honours
Israeli Premier League (1):
1970–71
Israel State Cup (1):
1976

References

Living people
Israeli Jews
Israeli footballers
Beitar Tel Aviv F.C. players
Maccabi Netanya F.C. players
Beitar Jerusalem F.C. players
Liga Leumit players
Association football midfielders
Year of birth missing (living people)